William Ernest Reed (born May 25, 1954) is a Canadian retired professional ice hockey defenceman. He was drafted in the fourth round, 72nd overall, by the Boston Bruins in the 1974 NHL Entry Draft.

Reed never played in the NHL, but did play 40 games in the World Hockey Association with the Michigan Stags/Baltimore Blades and Calgary Cowboys during the 1974–75 and 1975–76 WHA seasons. 

As a youth, he played in the 1966 Quebec International Pee-Wee Hockey Tournament with the Toronto Faustina minor ice hockey team from.

Reed also appeared in the movie Slap Shot. During the opening sequence Reed, wearing jersey #2, collides with a teammate wearing the #14 allowing the Chiefs to score. The player Reed runs into was his real life Johnstown Jets teammate, Vern Campigatto.

References

External links

1954 births
Living people
Baltimore Blades players
Boston Bruins draft picks
Calgary Cowboys players
Ice hockey people from Toronto
Michigan Stags draft picks
Michigan Stags players
San Diego Mariners (PHL) players
Springfield Indians players
Canadian ice hockey defencemen